Dollinger and Döllinger are surnames of German origin. They may refer to:

 Günther Dollinger (born 1960), German physicist and professor
 Ignaz Döllinger (1770–1841), German physician and university professor
 Ignaz von Döllinger (1799–1890), German theologian
 Isidore Dollinger (1903–2000), American politician
 Marie Dollinger (1910–1994), German track and field athlete
 Matthias Dollinger (born 1979), Austrian footballer
 Philippe Dollinger (1904-1999), French historian
 Richard A. Dollinger (born 1951), New York politician and judge
 Werner Dollinger (1918–2008), German politician

See also
Drollinger
Toponymic surnames